Lacefield is a surname. Notable people with the surname include:

Cleon Lacefield, American businessman
Reggie Lacefield (born 1945), American basketball player